Syzygium is a large, broadly distributed genus of flowering trees, shrubs, and subshrubs in the myrtle family Myrtaceae. The following is an alphabetical list of all 1197 species in the genus that are accepted by Plants of the World Online

A

 Syzygium abatakum 
 Syzygium abbreviatum 
 Syzygium aborense 
 Syzygium abortivum 
 Syzygium abulugense 
 Syzygium aciculinum 
 Syzygium acre 
 Syzygium acrophilum 
 Syzygium acuminatissimum 
 Syzygium acuminatum 
 Syzygium acutangulum 
 Syzygium acutatum 
 Syzygium adelphicum 
 Syzygium adenophyllum 
 Syzygium aegiceroides 
 Syzygium aemulum 
 Syzygium aeoranthum 
 Syzygium affine 
 Syzygium afromontanum 
 Syzygium agastyamalayanum 
 Syzygium aggregatum 
 Syzygium aksorniae 
 Syzygium alatoramulum 
 Syzygium alatum 
 Syzygium albayense 
 Syzygium albiflorum 
 Syzygium album 
 Syzygium alliiligneum 
 Syzygium altecastaneum 
 Syzygium alternifolium 
 Syzygium alubo 
 Syzygium alutaceum 
 Syzygium alvarezii 
 Syzygium alyxiifolium 
 Syzygium amicorum 
 Syzygium amieuense 
 Syzygium amphoraecarpus 
 Syzygium amplexicaule 
 Syzygium ampliflorum 
 Syzygium amplifolium 
 Syzygium amplum 
 Syzygium ampullarium 
 Syzygium anacardiifolium 
 Syzygium anamalaianum 
 Syzygium andamanicum 
 Syzygium aneityense 
 Syzygium angkae 
 Syzygium angophoroides 
 Syzygium angulare 
 Syzygium angulatum 
 Syzygium angustifolium 
 Syzygium angustovatum 
 Syzygium anisatum 
 Syzygium anisopetalum 
 Syzygium anisosepalum 
 Syzygium anomalum 
 Syzygium anthicoides 
 Syzygium anthicum 
 Syzygium antisepticum 
 Syzygium antonianum 
 Syzygium aoupinianum 
 Syzygium apetiolatum 
 Syzygium apiarii 
 Syzygium apodophyllum 
 Syzygium apodum 
 Syzygium apoense 
 Syzygium aqueum 
 Syzygium araiocladum 
 Syzygium arboreum 
 Syzygium arcanum 
 Syzygium arcuatinervium 
 Syzygium arenitense 
 Syzygium argyrocalyx 
 Syzygium argyropedicum 
 Syzygium armstrongii 
 Syzygium aromaticum 
 Syzygium assamicum 
 Syzygium assimile 
 Syzygium astronioides 
 Syzygium attenuatum 
 Syzygium attopeuense 
 Syzygium aurantiacum 
 Syzygium auriculatum 
 Syzygium australe 
 Syzygium austrocaledonicum 
 Syzygium austrosinense 
 Syzygium austroyunnanense 
 Syzygium avene

B

 Syzygium badescens 
 Syzygium badium 
 Syzygium baeuerlenii 
 Syzygium bakoense 
 Syzygium baladense 
 Syzygium balansae 
 Syzygium balerense 
 Syzygium balfourii 
 Syzygium balgooyi 
 Syzygium balsameum 
 Syzygium bamagense 
 Syzygium bankense 
 Syzygium banksii 
 Syzygium baramense 
 Syzygium barnesii 
 Syzygium barotsense 
 Syzygium barringtonioides 
 Syzygium bartonii 
 Syzygium bataanense 
 Syzygium batadamba 
 Syzygium baudouinii 
 Syzygium beccarii 
 Syzygium beddomei 
 Syzygium bengkulense 
 Syzygium benguellense 
 Syzygium benguetense 
 Syzygium benjaminum 
 Syzygium benthamianum 
 Syzygium bernardoi 
 Syzygium bernieri 
 Syzygium bharathii 
 Syzygium bicolor 
 Syzygium bicostatum 
 Syzygium bijouxii 
 Syzygium biniflorum 
 Syzygium bisulcum 
 Syzygium blancoi 
 Syzygium bleeseri 
 Syzygium blumei 
 Syzygium boerlagei 
 Syzygium boisianum 
 Syzygium bokorense 
 Syzygium boonjee 
 Syzygium borbonicum 
 Syzygium bordenii 
 Syzygium borneense 
 Syzygium boulindaense 
 Syzygium bourdillonii 
 Syzygium brachyanthelium 
 Syzygium brachybotryum 
 Syzygium brachycalyx 
 Syzygium brachypodum 
 Syzygium brachyrachis 
 Syzygium brachythyrsum 
 Syzygium brachyurum 
 Syzygium brackenridgei 
 Syzygium bracteosum 
 Syzygium branderhorstii 
 Syzygium brassii 
 Syzygium brazzavillense 
 Syzygium brevicymum 
 Syzygium brevifolium 
 Syzygium brevioperculatum 
 Syzygium brevipaniculatum 
 Syzygium brevipes 
 Syzygium brittonianum 
 Syzygium brongniartii 
 Syzygium brousmichei 
 Syzygium bruynii 
 Syzygium bubengense 
 Syzygium buettnerianum 
 Syzygium bujangii 
 Syzygium bullatum 
 Syzygium bullockii 
 Syzygium bungadinnia 
 Syzygium burepense 
 Syzygium burkillianum 
 Syzygium busuense 
 Syzygium buxifolioideum 
 Syzygium buxifolium

C

 Syzygium cacuminis 
 Syzygium cadetii 
 Syzygium cagayanense 
 Syzygium calcicola 
 Syzygium calleryanum 
 Syzygium callianthum 
 Syzygium calophyllifolium 
 Syzygium calubcob 
 Syzygium calyptrocalyx 
 Syzygium cameronum 
 Syzygium camptodromum 
 Syzygium camptophyllum 
 Syzygium candelabriforme 
 Syzygium canicortex 
 Syzygium capillaceum 
 Syzygium capitatum 
 Syzygium capituliferum 
 Syzygium capoasense 
 Syzygium cardiophyllum 
 Syzygium caroli 
 Syzygium carolinense 
 Syzygium carrii 
 Syzygium cartilagineum 
 Syzygium caryophyllatum 
 Syzygium caryophylliflorum 
 Syzygium caryophylloides 
 Syzygium casiguranense 
 Syzygium castaneum 
 Syzygium caudatilimbum 
 Syzygium caudatum 
 Syzygium cauliflorum 
 Syzygium cavitense 
 Syzygium celebicum 
 Syzygium cephalophorum 
 Syzygium cerasiforme 
 Syzygium chaii 
 Syzygium chamaebuxus 
 Syzygium championii 
 Syzygium chanelii 
 Syzygium chantaranothaianum 
 Syzygium chavaran 
 Syzygium chimanimaniense 
 Syzygium chloranthum 
 Syzygium chloroleucum 
 Syzygium christmannii 
 Syzygium christophersenii 
 Syzygium chunianum 
 Syzygium ciliatosetosum 
 Syzygium cinctum 
 Syzygium cinnamomeum 
 Syzygium cladopterum 
 Syzygium clavellatum 
 Syzygium claviflorum 
 Syzygium cleistocalyx 
 Syzygium clementis 
 Syzygium cleyerifolium 
 Syzygium clusiifolium 
 Syzygium clypeolatum 
 Syzygium coalitum 
 Syzygium coarctatum 
 Syzygium coccineum 
 Syzygium combretiflorum 
 Syzygium commersonii 
 Syzygium comorense 
 Syzygium comosum 
 Syzygium conceptionis 
 Syzygium concinnum 
 Syzygium condensatum 
 Syzygium confertiflorum 
 Syzygium confertum 
 Syzygium confusum 
 Syzygium congestiflorum 
 Syzygium congestum 
 Syzygium conglobatum 
 Syzygium conglomeratum 
 Syzygium congolense 
 Syzygium conicum 
 Syzygium consanguineum 
 Syzygium consimile 
 Syzygium conspersipunctatum 
 Syzygium contiguum 
 Syzygium contractum 
 Syzygium copelandii 
 Syzygium cordatilimbum 
 Syzygium cordatum 
 Syzygium cordemoyi 
 Syzygium cordifoliatum 
 Syzygium cordifolium 
 Syzygium coriaceum 
 Syzygium cormiflorum 
 Syzygium corneri 
 Syzygium cornifolium 
 Syzygium cornuflorum 
 Syzygium corticopapyraceum 
 Syzygium corticosum 
 Syzygium corymbosum 
 Syzygium corynanthum 
 Syzygium corynocarpum 
 Syzygium costulatum 
 Syzygium courtallense 
 Syzygium craibii 
 Syzygium crassibracteatum 
 Syzygium crassiflorum 
 Syzygium crassilimbum 
 Syzygium crassipes 
 Syzygium crassissimum 
 Syzygium cratermontense 
 Syzygium cravenii 
 Syzygium creaghii 
 Syzygium crebrinerve 
 Syzygium cruriflorum 
 Syzygium crypteronioides 
 Syzygium cucphuongense 
 Syzygium cumini 
 Syzygium cuneatum 
 Syzygium cuneifolium 
 Syzygium cuneiforme 
 Syzygium curranii 
 Syzygium curtiflorum 
 Syzygium curtisii 
 Syzygium curvistylum 
 Syzygium cuttingii 
 Syzygium cyanophyllum 
 Syzygium cylindricum 
 Syzygium cymosum 
 Syzygium cyrtophylloides

D

 Syzygium danguyanum 
 Syzygium dansiei 
 Syzygium daphne 
 Syzygium dasyphyllum 
 Syzygium davaoense 
 Syzygium dawsonianum 
 Syzygium dealbatum 
 Syzygium decipiens 
 Syzygium decoriflorum 
 Syzygium decussatum 
 Syzygium delicatulum 
 Syzygium dempoense 
 Syzygium densiflorum 
 Syzygium densinervium 
 Syzygium deplanchei 
 Syzygium devogelii 
 Syzygium dictyoneurum 
 Syzygium dielsianum 
 Syzygium diffusiflorum 
 Syzygium diffusum 
 Syzygium diospyrifolium 
 Syzygium discophorum 
 Syzygium dispansum 
 Syzygium divaricatum 
 Syzygium dolichophyllum 
 Syzygium dolichorhynchum 
 Syzygium dolichostylum 
 Syzygium dubium 
 Syzygium duplomarginatum 
 Syzygium dupontii 
 Syzygium durifolium 
 Syzygium durum 
 Syzygium duthieanum 
 Syzygium dyerianum

E

 Syzygium ebaloii 
 Syzygium ecostulatum 
 Syzygium effusum 
 Syzygium elegans 
 Syzygium elephantinum 
 Syzygium elliptifolium 
 Syzygium elliptilimbum 
 Syzygium elopurae 
 Syzygium emirnense 
 Syzygium endophloium 
 Syzygium erythranthum 
 Syzygium erythrocalyx 
 Syzygium erythrodoxum 
 Syzygium erythropetalum 
 Syzygium escritorii 
 Syzygium eucalyptoides 
 Syzygium eugeniiforme 
 Syzygium eugenioides 
 Syzygium euonymifolium 
 Syzygium euphlebium 
 Syzygium evenulosum 
 Syzygium everettii 
 Syzygium eximiiflorum 
 Syzygium eymae

F

 Syzygium faciflorum 
 Syzygium fastigiatum 
 Syzygium fenicis 
 Syzygium fergusonii 
 Syzygium fibrosum 
 Syzygium fijiense 
 Syzygium filiflorum 
 Syzygium filiforme 
 Syzygium filipes 
 Syzygium finisterrae 
 Syzygium fischeri 
 Syzygium flabellum 
 Syzygium flagrimonte 
 Syzygium flavescens 
 Syzygium flavidum 
 Syzygium floribundum 
 Syzygium flosculiferum 
 Syzygium fluviatile 
 Syzygium fluvicola 
 Syzygium formosanum 
 Syzygium formosum 
 Syzygium forrestii 
 Syzygium forte 
 Syzygium fossiramulosum 
 Syzygium foxworthianum 
 Syzygium foxworthyi 
 Syzygium francii 
 Syzygium francisii 
 Syzygium fraserense 
 Syzygium fraternum 
 Syzygium fratris 
 Syzygium frutescens 
 Syzygium fullagarii 
 Syzygium fulvotomentosum 
 Syzygium furfuraceum 
 Syzygium fuscescens 
 Syzygium fusticuliferum

G

 Syzygium gageanum 
 Syzygium galanthum 
 Syzygium ganophyllum 
 Syzygium garciae 
 Syzygium garcinifolioides 
 Syzygium garciniifolium 
 Syzygium garcinioides 
 Syzygium gardneri 
 Syzygium gaultherioides 
 Syzygium georgeae 
 Syzygium germainii 
 Syzygium gerrardii 
 Syzygium gigantifolium 
 Syzygium gillespiei 
 Syzygium gilletii 
 Syzygium giorgii 
 Syzygium gitingense 
 Syzygium gjellerupii 
 Syzygium glabratum 
 Syzygium gladiatum 
 Syzygium glanduligerum 
 Syzygium glaucissimum 
 Syzygium glaucum 
 Syzygium glenum 
 Syzygium globiflorum 
 Syzygium globosum 
 Syzygium glomeratum 
 Syzygium glomerulatum 
 Syzygium glomeruliferum 
 Syzygium gonatanthum 
 Syzygium goniocalyx 
 Syzygium goniopterum 
 Syzygium gonshanense 
 Syzygium goodenovii 
 Syzygium gracilipaniculum 
 Syzygium gracilipes 
 Syzygium graeffei 
 Syzygium graeme-andersoniae 
 Syzygium grande 
 Syzygium graveolens 
 Syzygium grayi 
 Syzygium grevesianum 
 Syzygium griffithii 
 Syzygium grijsii 
 Syzygium griseum 
 Syzygium guamense 
 Syzygium guangxiense 
 Syzygium guehoi 
 Syzygium guillauminii 
 Syzygium guineense 
 Syzygium gununganum 
 Syzygium gustavioides 
 Syzygium gyrostemoneum

H

 Syzygium hainanense 
 Syzygium halophilum 
 Syzygium hancei 
 Syzygium handelii 
 Syzygium haniffii 
 Syzygium harmandii 
 Syzygium havilandii 
 Syzygium hebephyllum 
 Syzygium hedraiophyllum 
 Syzygium helferi 
 Syzygium heloanthum 
 Syzygium hemilamprum 
 Syzygium hemisphericum 
 Syzygium hemsleyanum 
 Syzygium hendersonii 
 Syzygium heterobotrys 
 Syzygium hirtum 
 Syzygium hodgkinsoniae 
 Syzygium holttumii 
 Syzygium homichlophilum 
 Syzygium honbaense 
 Syzygium hookeri 
 Syzygium horsfieldii 
 Syzygium hoseanum 
 Syzygium houttuynii 
 Syzygium houttuyniifolia 
 Syzygium howii 
 Syzygium hughcumingii 
 Syzygium huillense 
 Syzygium hullettianum 
 Syzygium humbertii 
 Syzygium humblotii 
 Syzygium hutchinsonii 
 Syzygium hylochare 
 Syzygium hylophilum 
 Syzygium hypsipetes

I

 Syzygium idrisii 
 Syzygium ignambiense 
 Syzygium iliasii 
 Syzygium ilocanum 
 Syzygium imitans 
 Syzygium imperiale 
 Syzygium impressum 
 Syzygium inasense 
 Syzygium incarnatum 
 Syzygium incrassatum 
 Syzygium infrarubiginosum 
 Syzygium ingens 
 Syzygium inophylloides 
 Syzygium inophyllum 
 Syzygium inopinatum 
 Syzygium insulare 
 Syzygium × intermedium 
 Syzygium intumescens 
 Syzygium isabelense 
 Syzygium iteophyllum 
 Syzygium iwahigense 
 Syzygium ixoroides

J

 Syzygium jaffrei 
 Syzygium jaherii 
 Syzygium jainii 
 Syzygium jambos 
 Syzygium jasminifolium 
 Syzygium jienfunicum 
 Syzygium jiewhoei 
 Syzygium johnsonii 
 Syzygium jugorum

K

 Syzygium kabaense 
 Syzygium kajewskii 
 Syzygium kalahiense 
 Syzygium kanarense 
 Syzygium kanneliyense 
 Syzygium karimatense 
 Syzygium kemamanense 
 Syzygium keroanthum 
 Syzygium kerrii 
 Syzygium kerstingii 
 Syzygium ketambense 
 Syzygium keysseri 
 Syzygium khaoyaiense 
 Syzygium khasianum 
 Syzygium khoonmengianum 
 Syzygium kiahii 
 Syzygium kiauense 
 Syzygium kietanum 
 Syzygium kinabaluense 
 Syzygium kipidamasii 
 Syzygium klampok 
 Syzygium klossii 
 Syzygium koghianum 
 Syzygium kokomo 
 Syzygium komatiense 
 Syzygium koniamboense 
 Syzygium koordersianum 
 Syzygium korthalsianum 
 Syzygium korthalsii 
 Syzygium koumacense 
 Syzygium kriegeri 
 Syzygium kudatense 
 Syzygium kuebiniense 
 Syzygium kuiense 
 Syzygium kunstleri 
 Syzygium kuranda 
 Syzygium kurzii 
 Syzygium kusukusuense 
 Syzygium kwangtungense

L

 Syzygium lababiense 
 Syzygium labatii 
 Syzygium lacustre 
 Syzygium laetum 
 Syzygium lagerstmemioides 
 Syzygium lakshnakarae 
 Syzygium lambirense 
 Syzygium lamii 
 Syzygium lamprophyllum 
 Syzygium lanceolarium 
 Syzygium lanceolatum 
 Syzygium lancilimbum 
 Syzygium laqueatum 
 Syzygium lasianthifolium 
 Syzygium lateriflorum 
 Syzygium latifolium 
 Syzygium laurifolium 
 Syzygium laxeracemosum 
 Syzygium laxiflorum 
 Syzygium lecardii 
 Syzygium legatii 
 Syzygium lehuntii 
 Syzygium lenbrassii 
 Syzygium leonhardii 
 Syzygium leptoneurum 
 Syzygium leptophlebium 
 Syzygium leptopodium 
 Syzygium leptostemon 
 Syzygium leucanthum 
 Syzygium leucocladum 
 Syzygium leucoxylon 
 Syzygium levinei 
 Syzygium lewisii 
 Syzygium leytense 
 Syzygium lifuanum 
 Syzygium linocieroideum 
 Syzygium littorale 
 Syzygium littorosum 
 Syzygium llanosii 
 Syzygium loiseleurioides 
 Syzygium longifolium 
 Syzygium longipedicellatum 
 Syzygium longipes 
 Syzygium longipetiolatum 
 Syzygium longissimum 
 Syzygium longistylum 
 Syzygium lorentzianum 
 Syzygium lorofolium 
 Syzygium ludovicii 
 Syzygium luehmannii 
 Syzygium lugubre 
 Syzygium lunduense 
 Syzygium luteum 
 Syzygium luzonense

M

 Syzygium macgregorii 
 Syzygium macilwraithianum 
 Syzygium mackinnonianum 
 Syzygium macranthum 
 Syzygium macrocalyx 
 Syzygium macromyrtus 
 Syzygium madangense 
 Syzygium magnoliifolium 
 Syzygium maingayi 
 Syzygium mainitense 
 Syzygium maire 
 Syzygium makul 
 Syzygium malabaricum 
 Syzygium malaccense 
 Syzygium malagsam 
 Syzygium mamillatum 
 Syzygium mananquil 
 Syzygium manii 
 Syzygium maraca 
 Syzygium marginatum 
 Syzygium martelinoi 
 Syzygium masukuense 
 Syzygium mauritianum 
 Syzygium mauritsii 
 Syzygium medium 
 Syzygium megalanthum 
 Syzygium megalospermum 
 Syzygium megistophyllum 
 Syzygium melanophilum 
 Syzygium melanostictum 
 Syzygium melastomifolium 
 Syzygium melliodorum 
 Syzygium meorianum 
 Syzygium merokense 
 Syzygium merrittianum 
 Syzygium mesekerrak 
 Syzygium micans 
 Syzygium micklethwaitii 
 Syzygium micrandrum 
 Syzygium micranthum 
 Syzygium microcymum 
 Syzygium microphyllum 
 Syzygium micropodum 
 Syzygium millsii 
 Syzygium mimicum 
 Syzygium mindorense 
 Syzygium minimum 
 Syzygium minus 
 Syzygium minutiflorum 
 Syzygium minutuliflorum 
 Syzygium mirabile 
 Syzygium mirandae 
 Syzygium mishmiense 
 Syzygium monetarium 
 Syzygium monimioides 
 Syzygium monospermum 
 Syzygium montanum 
 Syzygium monticola 
 Syzygium montis-adam 
 Syzygium moorei 
 Syzygium mortonianum 
 Syzygium mouanum 
 Syzygium moultonii 
 Syzygium muelleri 
 Syzygium mulgraveanum 
 Syzygium multibracteolatum 
 Syzygium multiglandulosum 
 Syzygium multinerve 
 Syzygium multipetalum 
 Syzygium multipuncticulatum 
 Syzygium mundagam 
 Syzygium munnarense 
 Syzygium munroi 
 Syzygium myhendrae 
 Syzygium myriadenum 
 Syzygium myrianthum 
 Syzygium myrsinifolium 
 Syzygium myrtifolium 
 Syzygium myrtilloides 
 Syzygium myrtillus 
 Syzygium myrtoides

N

 Syzygium naiadum 
 Syzygium namosialangense 
 Syzygium nandarivatense 
 Syzygium nanpingense 
 Syzygium nanum 
 Syzygium napiforme 
 Syzygium neesianum 
 Syzygium nemorale 
 Syzygium neocaledonicum 
 Syzygium neoeugenioides 
 Syzygium neolaurifolium 
 Syzygium neriifolium 
 Syzygium nervosum 
 Syzygium neurocalyx 
 Syzygium neurophyllum 
 Syzygium ngadimanianum 
 Syzygium ngoyense 
 Syzygium niassense 
 Syzygium nicobaricum 
 Syzygium nidie 
 Syzygium nigrans 
 Syzygium nigricans 
 Syzygium nigropunctatum 
 Syzygium nitens 
 Syzygium nitidulum 
 Syzygium nitidum 
 Syzygium nitrasirirakii 
 Syzygium nivae 
 Syzygium nomoa 
 Syzygium normanbiensc 
 Syzygium novoguineense 
 Syzygium nummularium 
 Syzygium nutans

O

 Syzygium oblanceolatum 
 Syzygium oblancilimbum 
 Syzygium oblatum 
 Syzygium obliquinervium 
 Syzygium oblongifolium 
 Syzygium occidentale 
 Syzygium occlusum 
 Syzygium odoardoi 
 Syzygium odoratum 
 Syzygium oleosum 
 Syzygium oligadelphum 
 Syzygium oliganthum 
 Syzygium oligomyrum 
 Syzygium onesimum 
 Syzygium onivense 
 Syzygium oreophilum 
 Syzygium orites 
 Syzygium orthoneurum 
 Syzygium ovale 
 Syzygium ovalifolium 
 Syzygium owariense 
 Syzygium oxyphyllum

P

 Syzygium pachyanthum 
 Syzygium pachycladum 
 Syzygium pachyphyllum 
 Syzygium pachyrrachis 
 Syzygium pachysarcum 
 Syzygium pachysepalum 
 Syzygium padangense 
 Syzygium pahangense 
 Syzygium palauense 
 Syzygium palawanense 
 Syzygium palghatense 
 Syzygium pallens 
 Syzygium pallidilimbum 
 Syzygium pallidulum 
 Syzygium pallidum 
 Syzygium palodense 
 Syzygium paludosum 
 Syzygium panayense 
 Syzygium pancheri 
 Syzygium panduriforme 
 Syzygium paniculatum 
 Syzygium paniense 
 Syzygium panzeri 
 Syzygium papillosum 
 Syzygium papyraceum 
 Syzygium paradoxum 
 Syzygium paraiense 
 Syzygium parameswaranii 
 Syzygium parkeri 
 Syzygium parnellii 
 Syzygium parvicarpum 
 Syzygium parvifolium 
 Syzygium parvulum 
 Syzygium pascasioii 
 Syzygium patens 
 Syzygium patentinerve 
 Syzygium patentinervium 
 Syzygium paucinervium 
 Syzygium paucipunctatum 
 Syzygium paucivenium 
 Syzygium pauper 
 Syzygium peekelii 
 Syzygium pellucidum 
 Syzygium penasii 
 Syzygium pendens 
 Syzygium pendulinum 
 Syzygium penibukanense 
 Syzygium pennelii 
 Syzygium peregrinum 
 Syzygium perforatum 
 Syzygium pergamaceum 
 Syzygium pergamentaceum 
 Syzygium periyarense 
 Syzygium perryae 
 Syzygium perspicuinervium 
 Syzygium petakense 
 Syzygium petraeum 
 Syzygium petrinense 
 Syzygium petrophilum 
 Syzygium phacelanthum 
 Syzygium phaeophyllum 
 Syzygium phaeostictum 
 Syzygium phamhoangii 
 Syzygium phanerophlebium 
 Syzygium phengklaii 
 Syzygium philippinense 
 Syzygium phillyreifolium 
 Syzygium phoukhaokhouayense 
 Syzygium phryganodes 
 Syzygium pierrei 
 Syzygium pilgerianum 
 Syzygium piluliferum 
 Syzygium platycarpum 
 Syzygium platypodum 
 Syzygium plumbeum 
 Syzygium plumeum 
 Syzygium pluviatile 
 Syzygium polisense 
 Syzygium politum 
 Syzygium polyanthum 
 Syzygium polycephaloides 
 Syzygium polycephalum 
 Syzygium polypetaloideum 
 Syzygium polypetalum 
 Syzygium polyphlebium 
 Syzygium pondoense 
 Syzygium ponmudianum 
 Syzygium pontianakense 
 Syzygium populifolium 
 Syzygium porphyranthum 
 Syzygium porphyrocarpum 
 Syzygium potamicum 
 Syzygium poyanum 
 Syzygium praecox 
 Syzygium praestantilimbum 
 Syzygium praestigiosum 
 Syzygium praetermissum 
 Syzygium praineanum 
 Syzygium prasiniflorum 
 Syzygium pratense 
 Syzygium pringlei 
 Syzygium propinquum 
 Syzygium pseudocalcicola 
 Syzygium pseudoclaviflorum 
 Syzygium pseudofastigiatum 
 Syzygium pseudolaetum 
 Syzygium pseudomalaccense 
 Syzygium pseudomegistophyllum 
 Syzygium pseudomolle 
 Syzygium pseudopinnatum 
 Syzygium pterocalyx 
 Syzygium pterocarpum 
 Syzygium pterophorum 
 Syzygium pteropodum 
 Syzygium pterotum 
 Syzygium puberulum 
 Syzygium pulaiense 
 Syzygium pulgarense 
 Syzygium pullei 
 Syzygium punctilimbum 
 Syzygium purpureum 
 Syzygium purpuricarpum 
 Syzygium purpuriflorum 
 Syzygium pustulatum 
 Syzygium putii 
 Syzygium pycnanthum 
 Syzygium pyneei 
 Syzygium pyrifolium 
 Syzygium pyriforme 
 Syzygium pyrocarpum 
 Syzygium pyrrophloeum

Q

 Syzygium quadrangulare 
 Syzygium quadrangulatum 
 Syzygium quadratum 
 Syzygium quadrialatum 
 Syzygium quadribracteatum 
 Syzygium quadricostatum 
 Syzygium quadrisepalum

R

 Syzygium racemosum 
 Syzygium rakotovaoanum 
 Syzygium rama-varmae 
 Syzygium rambutyense 
 Syzygium ramiflorum 
 Syzygium ramilepis 
 Syzygium ramosii 
 Syzygium ramosissimum 
 Syzygium rampans 
 Syzygium randianum 
 Syzygium rechingeri 
 Syzygium recurvovenosum 
 Syzygium refertum 
 Syzygium rehderianum 
 Syzygium rejangense 
 Syzygium remotifolium 
 Syzygium resa 
 Syzygium reticulatum 
 Syzygium retinervium 
 Syzygium revolutum 
 Syzygium rheophyticum 
 Syzygium rhizophorum 
 Syzygium rhomboideum 
 Syzygium rhopalanthum 
 Syzygium richardsonianum 
 Syzygium richii 
 Syzygium ridleyi 
 Syzygium ridsdalei 
 Syzygium rigens 
 Syzygium rigidifolium 
 Syzygium riparium 
 Syzygium ripicola 
 Syzygium rivulare 
 Syzygium rizalense 
 Syzygium robbinsii 
 Syzygium robertii 
 Syzygium robinsonii 
 Syzygium robustum 
 Syzygium rockii 
 Syzygium roemeri 
 Syzygium rolfei 
 Syzygium rosaceum 
 Syzygium rosenbluthii 
 Syzygium roseomarginatum 
 Syzygium roseum 
 Syzygium rostadonis 
 Syzygium rostratum 
 Syzygium rosulentum 
 Syzygium rotundifolium 
 Syzygium rowlandii 
 Syzygium rubens 
 Syzygium rubescens 
 Syzygium rubicundum 
 Syzygium rubrimolle 
 Syzygium rubropunctatum 
 Syzygium rubropurpureum 
 Syzygium rubrovenium 
 Syzygium rugosum 
 Syzygium rumphii 
 Syzygium rysopodum

S

 Syzygium sabangense 
 Syzygium sahyadricum 
 Syzygium sakalavarum 
 Syzygium salicifolium 
 Syzygium saliciforme 
 Syzygium salicinum 
 Syzygium salictoides 
 Syzygium salignum 
 Syzygium salomonense 
 Syzygium salpinganthum 
 Syzygium salwinense 
 Syzygium samarangense 
 Syzygium sambiranense 
 Syzygium sambogense 
 Syzygium samoense 
 Syzygium sandwicense 
 Syzygium sanjappanum 
 Syzygium santosii 
 Syzygium sarmentosum 
 Syzygium sasidharanii 
 Syzygium saundersii 
 Syzygium savaiiense 
 Syzygium saxatile 
 Syzygium sayeri 
 Syzygium scabrum 
 Syzygium scalarinerve 
 Syzygium schistaceum 
 Syzygium schlechteri 
 Syzygium schlechterianum 
 Syzygium schmidii 
 Syzygium schumannianum 
 Syzygium schwenckii 
 Syzygium sclerophyllum 
 Syzygium scolopophyllum 
 Syzygium scortechinii 
 Syzygium scytophyllum 
 Syzygium seemannianum 
 Syzygium seemannii 
 Syzygium selukaifolium 
 Syzygium sessililimbum 
 Syzygium setosum 
 Syzygium sexangulatum 
 Syzygium sharoniae 
 Syzygium shimbaense 
 Syzygium siamense 
 Syzygium sichuanense 
 Syzygium siderocola 
 Syzygium silamense 
 Syzygium simile 
 Syzygium simillimum 
 Syzygium singaporense 
 Syzygium sirindhorniae 
 Syzygium skiophilum 
 Syzygium sleumeri 
 Syzygium slootenii 
 Syzygium smalianum 
 Syzygium smetsianum 
 Syzygium smithii 
 Syzygium snowianum 
 Syzygium soepadmoi 
 Syzygium sogerense 
 Syzygium sorongense 
 Syzygium spathulatum 
 Syzygium speciosissimum 
 Syzygium spectabile 
 Syzygium spissifolium 
 Syzygium splendens 
 Syzygium squamatum 
 Syzygium squamiferum 
 Syzygium sriganesanii 
 Syzygium stapfianum 
 Syzygium staudtii 
 Syzygium steenisii 
 Syzygium stelechanthoides 
 Syzygium stelechanthum 
 Syzygium stenocladum 
 Syzygium stenurum 
 Syzygium sterrophyllum 
 Syzygium stipitatum 
 Syzygium stipulare 
 Syzygium stocksii 
 Syzygium striatulum 
 Syzygium subalatum 
 Syzygium subamplexicaule 
 Syzygium subcapitulatum 
 Syzygium subcaudatum 
 Syzygium subcordatum 
 Syzygium subcorymbosum 
 Syzygium subcrenatum 
 Syzygium subdecussatum 
 Syzygium suberosum 
 Syzygium subfalcatum 
 Syzygium subfoetidum 
 Syzygium subglobosum 
 Syzygium subhorizontale 
 Syzygium subisense 
 Syzygium sublaetum 
 Syzygium subnodosum 
 Syzygium suborbiculare 
 Syzygium subrotundifolium 
 Syzygium subscandens 
 Syzygium subsessile 
 Syzygium subsessiliflorum 
 Syzygium subsessilifolium 
 Syzygium subsimile 
 Syzygium subtile 
 Syzygium sulcistylum 
 Syzygium sulitii 
 Syzygium sulphuratum 
 Syzygium sumatranum 
 Syzygium surigaense 
 Syzygium suringarianum 
 Syzygium swettenhamianum 
 Syzygium sylvicola 
 Syzygium symingtonianum 
 Syzygium synaptoneurum 
 Syzygium syzygioides

T

 Syzygium taeniatum 
 Syzygium tahanense 
 Syzygium taipingense 
 Syzygium taiwanicum 
 Syzygium tapiaka 
 Syzygium tavaiense 
 Syzygium tawahense 
 Syzygium tayabense 
 Syzygium taytayense 
 Syzygium tchambaense 
 Syzygium tectum 
 Syzygium tekuense 
 Syzygium tenellum 
 Syzygium tenuicaudatum 
 Syzygium tenuiflorum 
 Syzygium tenuifolium 
 Syzygium tenuilimbum 
 Syzygium tenuipes 
 Syzygium tenuirame 
 Syzygium tenuirhachis 
 Syzygium tephrodes 
 Syzygium teretiflorum 
 Syzygium tesselatum 
 Syzygium tetragonum 
 Syzygium tetrapleurum 
 Syzygium tetrapterum 
 Syzygium thalassicum 
 Syzygium thompsonii 
 Syzygium thomsenii 
 Syzygium thorelii 
 Syzygium thornei 
 Syzygium thouvenotii 
 Syzygium thumra 
 Syzygium tierneyanum 
 Syzygium timorianum 
 Syzygium tiumanense 
 Syzygium toddalioides 
 Syzygium tolypanthum 
 Syzygium toninense 
 Syzygium tonkinense 
 Syzygium tontoutaense 
 Syzygium toppingii 
 Syzygium torricellianum 
 Syzygium trachyanthum 
 Syzygium trachyphloium 
 Syzygium treubii 
 Syzygium trianthum 
 Syzygium trichotomum 
 Syzygium tricolor 
 Syzygium tringiense 
 Syzygium tripetalum 
 Syzygium triphlebium 
 Syzygium triphyllum 
 Syzygium tripinnatum 
 Syzygium triplinervium 
 Syzygium triste 
 Syzygium trivene 
 Syzygium trukense 
 Syzygium tsoongii 
 Syzygium tubiflorum 
 Syzygium tula 
 Syzygium turbinatum 
 Syzygium tympananthum

U

 Syzygium ubogoense 
 Syzygium ultramaficum 
 Syzygium umbellatum 
 Syzygium umbilicatum 
 Syzygium umbrosum 
 Syzygium uniflorum 
 Syzygium unipunctatum 
 Syzygium urceolatum 
 Syzygium urdanetense 
 Syzygium urophyllum 
 Syzygium utilis

V

 Syzygium vacciniifolium 
 Syzygium valdecoriaceum 
 Syzygium valdepunctatum 
 Syzygium valdevenosum 
 Syzygium valentissimum 
 Syzygium valetonianum 
 Syzygium validinerve 
 Syzygium validum 
 Syzygium vanderwateri 
 Syzygium vanuatuense 
 Syzygium variabile 
 Syzygium variifolium 
 Syzygium variolosum 
 Syzygium vaughanii 
 Syzygium vaupelii 
 Syzygium veillonii 
 Syzygium velarum 
 Syzygium velutinum 
 Syzygium venosum 
 Syzygium venustum 
 Syzygium verniciflorum 
 Syzygium vernicosum 
 Syzygium vernonioides 
 Syzygium verrucosum 
 Syzygium versteegii 
 Syzygium vestitum 
 Syzygium viburnoides 
 Syzygium vidalianum 
 Syzygium vieillardii 
 Syzygium villamilii 
 Syzygium villiferum 
 Syzygium virescens 
 Syzygium viridescens 
 Syzygium viriosum 
 Syzygium virotii 
 Syzygium vismioides 
 Syzygium vrieseanum 
 Syzygium vulcanicum

W

 Syzygium wagapense 
 Syzygium waikaiunense 
 Syzygium walkeri 
 Syzygium warburgii 
 Syzygium waterhousei 
 Syzygium watsonianum 
 Syzygium watutense 
 Syzygium wenshanense 
 Syzygium wenzelii 
 Syzygium wesa 
 Syzygium whitfordii 
 Syzygium williamsii 
 Syzygium wilsonii 
 Syzygium winckelii 
 Syzygium winitii 
 Syzygium wolfii 
 Syzygium wollastonii 
 Syzygium womersleyi 
 Syzygium wrayi 
 Syzygium wrightii

X

 Syzygium xanthophyllum 
 Syzygium xanthostemifolium 
 Syzygium xerampelinum 
 Syzygium xiphophyllum 
 Syzygium xizangense 
 Syzygium xylopiaceum

Y

 Syzygium yersinii 
 Syzygium yunnanense

Z

 Syzygium zamboangense 
 Syzygium zeylanicum 
 Syzygium zhenghei 
 Syzygium zimmermannii 
 Syzygium zollingerianum

References

L
Syzygium